Synchiropus rubrovinctus, the tiny Hawaiian dragonet, is a species of dragonet native to the western Pacific where it has been found around Japan, New Caledonia and Hawaii. This species reaches a length of  TL.

References

rubrovinctus
Fish of the Pacific Ocean
Fish of East Asia
Fish of New Caledonia
Fish of Hawaii
Taxa named by Charles Henry Gilbert
Fish described in 1905